"Bersama Pertemuan Ini" is the second duet studio album by Francissca Peter & Royston Sta Maria, released in 1982 on EMI.

Track listing
All arrangements by Omar Taib, except "Sejak Kau Ku Kenal" and "Cerita Lama Jangan Ditany" (arranged by S. Atan) and "Kisah Lalu" and Demi Cinta Sejati" (arranged by Martin Pereira).

References

External links 
 Official Website

1982 albums
Francissca Peter albums
Vocal duet albums
EMI Records albums
Malay-language albums